Kim Flowers is a former American actress who is best known for her supporting roles in the films Alien: Resurrection and Another Day in Paradise and for her supporting roles in the TV series Pensacola: Wings of Gold and H.E.L.P.

Personal life
Flowers is a ballet dancer and has been dancing since she was 3. She retired from acting in 1998.

Filmography

Film

Television

References

External links

American film actresses
Year of birth missing (living people)
Living people
21st-century American women